Ingrid Isensee (born 31 December 1974) is a Chilean actress. She appeared in more than twenty films since 2004.

Selected filmography

References

External links 

1974 births
Living people
Chilean film actresses